38 Geminorum is a binary star system in the northern zodiac constellation of Gemini. It has the Bayer designation e Geminorum, while 38 Geminorum is the Flamsteed designation. This system is visible to the naked eye as a faint, white-hued point of light with an apparent visual magnitude of 4.71. The primary component is a magnitude 4.75 star, while the secondary is magnitude 7.80. The system is located about 98 light years away from the Sun based on parallax, and is drifting further away with a radial velocity of +16 km/s. It is a potential member of the Tucana–Horologium stellar kinematic group.

As of 2018, the pair had an angular separation of  along a position angle of 143°.

Abt and Morrell (1995) classified the primary component as an A-type main-sequence star with a stellar classification of A8V. It is a suspected chemically peculiar star of subtype CP1 (an Am star), which Slettebak (1955) classified as kA8mF0Vp. This notation indicates the star displays the calcium K line of an A8 star and the metal lines of an F0V star. In 1949, J. Hopmann catalogued it as a suspected Delta Scuti variable. The secondary is a G-type main-sequence star with a class of G6V.

References

A-type main-sequence stars
G-type main-sequence stars
Am stars
Delta Scuti variables
Suspected variables
Binary stars

Gemini (constellation)
Geminorum, e
Durchmusterung objects
Geminorum, 38
9220
050635
033202
2564